Victor Hănescu was the defending champion but decided not to participate.
Andreas Haider-Maurer defeated Rubén Ramírez Hidalgo 6–4, 3–6, 6–4 in the final to take the title.

Seeds

Draw

Finals

Top half

Bottom half

References
 Main Draw
 Qualifying Draw

BRD Timisoara Challenger - Singles
2013 Singles